Eastgardens may refer to:
Eastgardens, New South Wales, a suburb of Sydney in New South Wales, Australia
Westfield Eastgardens, a major shopping centre in the suburb